Kewal Singh Dhillon is an Indian politician and member of Bharatiya Janata Party since June 2022.

Early life and education 

Dhillon was born on 16 May 1950 in the village of Tallewal, Barnala. He got his preliminary education in Barnala and was also brought up there.

Career

Congress 
He was also senior vice-president of Punjab Pradesh Congress Committee (PPCC), who was a member of the Punjab Legislative Assembly (2012–17) for the constituency of Barnala representing the INC and also contested from Sangrur unsuccessfully in the 2019 Indian general election.

Bharatiya Janta Party
He joined Bharatiya Janata Party on 4 June 2022 along with Raj Kumar Verka, Balbir Singh Sidhu, Gurpreet Singh Kangar, Sundar Sham Arora, and others at the party office in Chandigarh.

Electoral performance

References 

Living people
Punjab, India MLAs 2012–2017
1950 births
Bharatiya Janata Party politicians from Punjab
Indian National Congress politicians